Ashino is a rural locality (a selo) in Botlikshky Selsoviet, Botlikhsky District, Republic of Dagestan, Russia. The population was 79 as of 2010.

Geography 
Ashino is located 15 km northwest of Botlikh (the district's administrative centre) by road, on the right bank of the Ansalta River. Tando is the nearest rural locality.

References 

Rural localities in Botlikhsky District